Dibromodiethyl sulfoxide is a sulfoxide (S=O) containing two 2-bromo-ethyl substituents.

Production
Dibromodiethyl sulfoxide is produced from dibromodiethyl sulfide by oxidation by benzoyl peroxide.

References

Organobromides
Sulfoxides